Walter Byron (11 June 1899 – 2 March 1972) was an English film actor.

Biography

He starred opposite Gloria Swanson in the 1929 film Queen Kelly and appeared in more than 60 films between 1926 and 1942. He first sailed to the United States on the R.M.S. Aquitania under contract with Samuel Goldwyn Productions, in 1928. In 1932, in order to gain permanent legal immigrant status, he crossed the border at Calexico into Mexico and then reentered the United States there under the new status. He became a United States citizen in 1954.

Selected filmography

 White Heat (1927) - Julian Jefferson
 Passion Island (1927) - Tony
 One of the Best (1927) - Lt. Dudley Keppel
 Victory (1928) - Major King
 Two Little Drummer Boys (1928) - Capt. Carsdale
 Tommy Atkins (1928) - Harold
 The Awakening (1928) - Count Karl von Hagen
 Yvette (1928)
 The Passenger (1928)
 Croquette (1928) - Bob
Queen Kelly (1929) - Prince Wolfram
 The Sacred Flame (1929) - Colin Taylor
 Not Damaged (1930) - Kirk Randolph
 The Dancers (1930) - Berwin
 The Lion and the Lamb (1931) - Dave
 The Reckless Hour (1931) - Allen Crane
 The Last Flight (1931) - Frink
 Left Over Ladies (1931) - Ronny
 The Yellow Ticket (1931) - Count Nikolai
 Three Wise Girls (1932) - Jerry Dexter
 The Menace (1932) - Ronald Quayle / Robert Crockett
 Shop Angel (1932) - Don Irwin
 Vanity Fair (1932) - George Osborne
 Sinners in the Sun (1932) - Eric Nelson
 Society Girl (1932) - Warburton
 Week Ends Only (1932) - Jimmy Brigg
 Exposure (1932) - Andy Bryant
 This Sporting Age (1932) - Charles Morrell
 The Crusader (1932) - Joe Carson
 Slightly Married (1932) - Jimmie Martin
 Queen Kelly (1932) - Prince Wolfram
 The Savage Girl (1932) - Jim Franklin
 Grand Slam (1933) - Barney Starr (uncredited)
 What Price Decency (1933) - Tom O'Neil
 Kiss of Araby (1933) - Lt. W. B. Lawrence
 Charlie Chan's Greatest Case (1933) - Henry Jennison
 Big Time or Bust (1933) - John Hammond
 East of Fifth Avenue (1933) - Paul Baxter
 Man of Two Worlds (1934) - Eric Pager
 Once to Every Woman (1934) - Dr. Preston
 All Men Are Enemies (1934) - Walter Ripton
 British Agent (1934) - Under Secretary Stanley
 Folies Bergère de Paris (1935) - Marquis René de Lac
 Don't Bet on Blondes (1935) - Dwight Boardman
 If You Could Only Cook (1935) - Roy - Pianist at Wedding Rehearsal (uncredited)
 The Bridge of Sighs (1936) - Arny Norman
 Mary of Scotland (1936) - Walsingham
 Top of the Town (1937) - Nightclub Patron (uncredited)
 As Good as Married (1937) - Server (uncredited)
 Back in Circulation (1937) - Carlton Whitney
 Mr. Boggs Steps Out (1938) - Dennis Andrews
 Frontier Scout (1938) - Lt. Adams
 Trade Winds (1938) - Bob (uncredited)
 Risky Business (1939) - Actor (uncredited)
 Death Goes North (1939) - Al Norton
 Crashing Thru (1939) - McClusky
 A Girl, a Guy and a Gob (1941) - Opera Patron (uncredited)
 One Night in Lisbon (1941) - Dinner Guest (uncredited)
 Confirm or Deny (1941) - Minor Role (uncredited)
 Nazi Agent (1942) - Officer (uncredited)
 Mrs. Miniver (1942) - Man in Tavern (uncredited)
 The Mummy's Tomb (1942) - Searcher (uncredited)
 Once Upon a Honeymoon (1942) - Guard (uncredited)
 Gentleman Jim (1942) - Ringside Telegrapher (uncredited)

References

External links

1899 births
1972 deaths
English male film actors
English male silent film actors
People from Leicester
20th-century English male actors
Male actors from Leicestershire
English emigrants to the United States
People from Signal Hill, California